= Constituency PSW-132 =

Reserved constituency of the Provincial Assembly of Sindh, Pakistan

PSW-132
- Provincial Reserved constituency for the Provincial Assembly of Sindh

Current constituency

PSW-132 is a Constituency of the Provincial Assembly of Sindh.

== See also ==
- Sindh
